The Natural World Book Prize was an award organised by The Wildlife Trusts, and presented to recognise environmental literature. Considered the premier environmental book prize in the UK, it was sometimes referred to as the 'green Booker'. It was formerly known as the BP Natural World Book Prize (after its sponsor, BP), and in origin it was a merging of two previous awards, BP's Sir Peter Kent Book Prize, and a competition run by The Natural World, the magazine of the Wildlife Trusts.

Winners

1987 - Chris Baines - The Wild Side of Town
1988 - Jeremy Purseglove - Taming of the Flood
1989 - Philip Wayre - Operation Otter
1990 - Jonathan Kingdon - Island Africa: The Evolution of Africa's Rare Animals and Plants
1991 - George Monbiot - Amazon Watershed
1992 - Iain Douglas Hamilton, Oria Douglas Hamilton - Battle for the Elephants
1993 - Edward O. Wilson - The Diversity of Life
1994 - Oliver Rackham - The Illustrated History of the Countryside
1995 - Colin Tudge - The Day Before Yesterday
1996 - David Quammen - The Song of the Dodo
1997 - Graham Harvey - The Killing of the Countryside
1998 - David Attenborough - The Life of Birds
1999 - Steve Jones - Almost Like a Whale
2000 - Brian Clarke - The Stream
2001 - No Award
2002 - Edward O. Wilson - The Future of Life

See also

 List of environmental awards

Sources
List of winners, from The Booklist Center, accessed 14 May 2009
Six line up for lesser-spotted Booker prize, Michael McCarthy, The Independent, 30 November 1998
BP Natural World Book Prize, design of one of the logos, accessed 14 May 2009

Environmental awards
British non-fiction literary awards
Awards established in 1987
1987 establishments in the United Kingdom